Baliapara High School And College is a higher secondary school at Baliapara Bazar in Araihazar Upazila, Narayanganj District, Bangladesh. It is one of the oldest school in the upazila. This school is situated in the western last part of Araihazar. In this school, students from others upazila likes Rupganj and Sonargaon's last part get involved here. This is the only secondary school for the students of the following village- Baliapara, Pakunda, Hoargaon, Dorikandi, Gabtoli, Dahorgaon, Utrapur, Kodomdi, Loskordi, Padardiya, Monohordi and others. There are 1,500 students currently study in this school from class six to SSC exam. Recently This school introduce a college branch under technical board.  There are 25 teachers in this school.

References

High schools in Bangladesh